XEZOL-AM (860 kHz) is a radio station in Ciudad Juárez, Chihuahua. It is owned by MegaRadio Networks and known as Líder Informativo.

History
XEZOL received its concession on January 8, 1980.

On September 6, 2021, XEZOL changed names from Radio Noticias to Líder Informativo.

References

Radio stations in Chihuahua